Denhof - is a Polish coat of arms. It was used by several szlachta families in the times of the Polish–Lithuanian Commonwealth. Dönhoff (German) or Denhoff (Polish) (sometimes also Denhof or Doenhoff) was a Livonian German noble family, a branch of which moved to the Polish–Lithuanian Commonwealth in the 16th century and became recognized as a Polish noble (szlachta) there.

History

Blazon
Argent a boar's head caboshed sable armed of the field.  Crest: issuant out of a crest coronet or a demi-boar sable armed argent pierced by two spears saltire-wise points in chief also argent.  Mantled sable doubled argent.

Notable bearers
Notable bearers of this coat of arms include:
Ernst Magnus Dönhoff (1581-1642), voivode of Parnawa (1640-1642)
Kasper Dönhoff (1587-1645), voivode of Dorpat (1627-1634)
Alexander von Dönhoff (1683-1742), Prussian Lieutenant-General
Sophie von Dönhoff (1768-1838), morganatic spouse of Frederick William II of Prussia
August Heinrich Hermann von Dönhoff (1797-1874), Prussian diplomat
Marion Dönhoff (1909-2002), a German journalist

See also
 Polish heraldry
 Heraldry

Sources
Herbarz Polski - Polish Armorial 2009/2010 (Tadeusz Gajl) - Herb Denhof
Denhoff (herb szlachecki), according to Polish site (June 19, 2011) 
Dönhoff

Polish coats of arms